Vale of White Horse District Council is the local authority for the Vale of White Horse, a non-metropolitan district in the south-west of Oxfordshire, England, that was created on 1 April 1974.

Political control

At the first elections in 1973 forty-nine district councillors were elected from thirty-one electoral wards. Currently thirty-eight councillors are elected from twenty four electoral wards, which cover the principal towns of Abingdon, Faringdon and Wantage and surrounding villages. This was effective from the 2015 elections.

Between 2011 and 2019 the council had a Conservative majority. The Liberal Democrats took control from May 2019. Elections of the full council take place every four years.

At the May 2019 local elections, the Liberal Democrats overcame the Tories' 20-seat majority to become the major party with a 24-seat majority.

Premises

The council was initially based in a number of offices inherited from its predecessor authorities across the district. In the early 1990s the council built itself a new headquarters in Abingdon called Abbey House (or "New Abbey House" to distinguish it from the neighbouring building formerly also called Abbey House, which was renamed "Old Abbey House").

In 2014 the council largely vacated Abbey House, retaining only a small presence there, with most of Abbey House since 2014 being occupied instead by Oxfordshire County Council. Vale of White Horse moved most of its staff to share the offices of its neighbour South Oxfordshire in Crowmarsh Gifford, but in 2015 that building was destroyed in a fire following an arson attack. From 2015 until 2022, Vale of White Horse and South Oxfordshire shared temporary office accommodation at Milton Park near Didcot. The two councils returned to Abbey House in 2022 as a temporary measure, with the intention being to build a new shared headquarters in Didcot.

See also
 List of electoral wards in Oxfordshire

References

External links
 

Local authorities in Oxfordshire
Non-metropolitan district councils of England
Vale of White Horse